Oh, Please is the debut studio album from the American rock group dollys.

Content 
The nine-track album was released on vinyl, compact disc and digitally with Sniffling Indie Kids, on June 19, 2015. It was recorded at Lakehouse Recording Studios in Asbury Park, New Jersey, with production by Erik Kase Romero and engineering and mixing by Erik Kase Romero and Tim Pannella. Additional engineering is by Wayne Darling, Colin Mccabe and Ty Bean, with mastering by Paul Gold at Salt Mastering. The recording was made using analog tape, and in an interview with NJ.com, Romero notes the experience allowed the group to "appreciate the gravity of our performance," with Newbold adding "we want [the record] to be candid and heartfelt." Newbold's vocals are likened to Alvvays' Molly Rankin, and Lane's guitar-work to the Smiths' Johnny Marr.

The music video for "Lilypad" was released on June 27, 2014, and contains footage of the band performing in a house, while their lyrics are drawn out along town, and return to the house where they are performing at. It was written by Newbold and Mendonez, directed by Newbold, and shot by Newbold and Gregory Michael Fernandez.

Oh, Please was listed in the Asbury Park Press The Top 9 New Jersey indie albums of 2015, who describe it as "fey indie-pop delivered with reverb and charm," who add "keep your eye on drummer Natalie Newbold – we see her as the Millennial Karen Carpenter." Phil Sheppard of Speak Into My Good Eye notes, there is a "pure and energetic innocence within this nine song album. Drifting melodies along with a very dreamy and ethereal quality. Indie pop with undertones of the 1960s." A review by Medium says "dollys takes the genre indie-pop and smears it around to create a hazy but unyielding sound[;] full of Beach Boy-like harmonies, dollys produce bright and honest pop music." The Riverfront Times says "the band's full-length debut Oh, Please solemnly swears by strong leads and special attention to texture. This kind of simplicity takes discipline, especially in the martial art of music."

Track listing

Personnel 
Erik Kase Romero – bass and vocals
Jeff Lane – guitar, keys and vocals
Michael Mendonez – guitar
Natalie Newbold – drums and vocals

References 
Citations

Bibliography

External links 

2015 albums
Dollys albums
Sniffling Indie Kids albums